The Anchoress is the stage name of Welsh-born multi-instrumentalist, songwriter and author Catherine Anne Davies.

Davies was born in Glynneath, Wales but at 10 weeks old was taken to Australia with her parents before returning to the UK at the age of four, where she grew up in Aylesbury, Buckinghamshire, England.

Biography 
Davies formed The Anchoress in 2013. The Anchoress's debut album Confessions of a Romance Novelist, co-produced by Paul Draper, was released on 15 January 2016 via Kscope. The album was named amongst the Guardian critics' Albums of the Year, won HMV’s Welsh Album of the Year, Best Newcomer at the PROG awards, and a nomination for Welsh Music Prize.

In July 2016, The Anchoress supported and duetted with Manic Street Preachers at the Eden Project and again supported the band in June 2017, before duetting on 'Little Baby Nothing' at the Q Awards in October 2017. She supported Simple Minds on the UK leg of their Acoustic Tour in May/June 2017.
In 2017, Davies co-wrote and engineered 5 tracks on long-term collaborator Paul Draper's debut solo album Spooky Action. She performed with Draper on his 6-date UK tour in September 2017 and appears on keyboards and vocals on the live album Spooky Action: Live At The Scala.

From 2014 until July 2018, Davies performed in Simple Minds, contributing additional guitar, vocals and keyboards. She met Jim Kerr, the lead singer and one of the principal songwriters in Simple Minds, when both were in The Dark Flowers, a band assembled to record a 2013 album of songs based on a Sam Shepard book. She has also performed live with Ed Harcourt at Glastonbury Festival, as well as Martha Wainwright.

In 2018, she duetted with Manic Street Preachers on their song "Dylan & Caitlin", released as a single and on their album Resistance is Futile, as well as appearing on the Simple Minds album Walk Between Worlds. In October of the same year she appeared as a co-host on the BBC Radio 6 Music show about The Beatles's White Album, alongside Martin Freeman and John Simm.

In October 2019, Davies launched a new podcast series entitled "The Art of Losing" taking on the topic of loss and grief, with guests including the producer and engineer Mario McNulty and playwright Patrick Jones. Her second album of the same name was released in March 2021. The first single "Show Your Face", featuring guest guitars from James Dean Bradfield, was premiered by Steve Lamacq on BBC 6Music and the accompanying video premiered on NME.com.

In March 2021, Davies released her second album The Art of Losing which was named amongst the "Best Albums of 2021" by numerous publications, including The Sunday Times, Prog magazine, Record Collector, The Line of Best Fit, The Sun, Yorkshire Post, and Classic Rock.

Davies was nominated for Self-Producing Artist of the Year at the 2022 Music Producer Guild Awards.

In November 2022, Davies was granted a six-month stalking protection order against longtime collaborator Paul Draper. The former Mansun lead singer was accused of stalking Davies and sending “abusive and sexually orientated” messages after their romantic relationship ended in 2018.

In February 2023, Davies was nominated for the second time for  Self-Producing Artist of the Year at the 2023 Music Producers Guild Awards alongside Hannah Peel and Devonte Hynes (aka Blood Orange).

Solo and side projects 
Prior to The Anchoress project, Davies self-released music under her own name and as Catherine A.D.

In 2009, Davies performed with London Philharmonic Orchestra as an artist-in-residence at London's South Bank Centre. Through this role, she wrote with Riz MC and collaborated with Nitin Sawhney.

In 2011, under the abbreviated A.D. guise, Davies released the single Carry Your Heart, and a mini-album entitled Communion. NME described Communion as an "understated but beautiful mini-album" when naming it one of the 20 best "cult/experimental" albums of 2011. She also released a collection of covers entitled Reprise. The release featured re-interpretations of songs by Friendly Fires, Sleigh Bells, Nick Drake, Tracy Chapman, Bon Iver, Hurts, My Brightest Diamond, The Crystals, Nina Simone and The Magnetic Fields.

The Anchoress appeared as a guest vocalist on the March 2017 limited 7" vinyl release of "Fend For Yourself" by the band The Pineapple Thief.

In June 2016, Davies co-wrote and played on EP ONE with long-term collaborator Paul Draper, as well as featuring on guest vocals on the song "No Ideas" with Steven Wilson. She also co-wrote and performs on 2 tracks on the follow up release, EP TWO, released in November 2016.

In 2017, Davies co-wrote and engineered five tracks on long-term collaborator Paul Draper's debut solo album Spooky Action.

Davies is also a member of The Dark Flowers "super-group". The project was started by songwriter and producer Paul Statham in 2009. She appears alongside vocalists Jim Kerr, Kate Havnevik, Dot Allison, Peter Murphy, Shelly Poole, Helicopter Girl and Remi Roughe. In an interview with Clash, Davies said "It’s basically a project put together by a guy called Paul Statham who’s a songwriter/producer and he had this idea to make a dark country record, kind of like the ‘Paris/Texas’ soundtrack."

Davies also appeared as a backing vocalist on Emmy The Great's debut single "Secret Circus".

In 2020, she released two singles under her own name with former Suede and McAlmont & Butler guitarist Bernard Butler entitled "The Breakdown" and "Sabotage (Looks So Easy)". On July 22 in NME they announced the release date of their collaborative album "In Memory Of My Feelings" via Needle Mythology.

In June 2022 Davies released the collaborative single ‘ Human Reciprocator’ with Band Spectra which was described as “delving into the discontent, disillusionment, and anger over the current political landscape in the UK”.

Writing 
Davies has a PhD in literature and queer theory from University College London, and has published a book entitled Whitman's Queer Children about epic poetry through Bloomsbury Publishing.

Davies has written about film-maker David Lynch for the NME, and has interviewed Tori Amos and Manic Street Preachers for Drowned in Sound.

Discography

Studio albums
 Confessions of a Romance Novelist (2016)
 The Art of Losing (2021)

Live albums
 Live at the London Palladium (2020)

Collaboration albums
 In Memory of My Feelings (2020) with Bernard Butler (under her birth name)

EPs and singles
 "What Goes Around" – Too Pure Singles Club release, 7" (2014)
 One for Sorrow – Hiraeth Records, 12" EP (2014)
 What Goes Around –  EP (2015)
 Doesn't Kill You –  EP (2016)
 You and Only You –  EP (2016)
 Reprise 2: The Covers Collection – bandcamp, EP (2020)

References

External links 
 

Welsh musicians
Living people
Year of birth missing (living people)
People from Glynneath
Alumni of University College London